The 1971–72 season was the 70th season in which Dundee competed at a Scottish national level, playing in Division One, where the club would finish in 5th place for the second consecutive season. Domestically, Dundee would also compete in both the Scottish League Cup and the Scottish Cup, where they would get knocked out in the group stages of the League Cup, and by Celtic in the 4th round of the Scottish Cup. Dundee would also compete in the UEFA Cup, where they would reach the 3rd round before being eliminated by A.C. Milan.

For the first time since the 1945–46 season, and the first time in the Scottish Football League since the 1901–02 season, Dundee would switch their primary colours from navy blue to white. The change however proved unpopular, and it would be the last season to date where the club alternated from their traditional home colours.

Scottish Division One 

Statistics provided by Dee Archive.

League table

Scottish League Cup 

Statistics provided by Dee Archive.

Group 2

Group 2 table

Scottish Cup 

Statistics provided by Dee Archive.

UEFA Cup

Player statistics 
Statistics provided by Dee Archive

|}

See also 

 List of Dundee F.C. seasons

References

External links 

 1971-72 Dundee season on Fitbastats

Dundee F.C. seasons
Dundee